Cal Dalton (December 2, 1908 – June 1974) was an American animator and director at Warner Bros. Cartoons.

Work
Dalton's first commercial animation work was in 1930 at the ill-fated Romer Grey Studios. He later worked on an animated short version of The Wizard of Oz that was produced by Ted Eshbaugh's independent animation studio in 1933. Afterwards, Dalton left to work at Leon Schlesinger Productions, with his first project being 1934's Viva Buddy. All together, Dalton worked on 33 Warner Bros. cartoons as part of their animation department.

In 1938, following Friz Freleng's departure, Dalton was promoted to director; for unknown reasons, he was never allowed to be sole director, and shared his duties initially with Cal Howard, and then Ben Hardaway. Dalton later admitted feeling aggrieved about the fact that while he was meant to be nominally in charge of Freleng's former unit, he tended to be overshadowed by the presence of the more experienced Hardaway.

Cal Dalton's major contribution to the legacy of Warner Bros. animation was having co-directed Hare-um Scare-um in 1939 with Hardaway. The short featured a gray and white rabbit that served as the prototype for Bugs Bunny. Dalton directed or co-directed a total of 17 Warner Bros. cartoons from 1938 through 1940. He spent the rest of his years at Warner Bros. doing strictly animation work before leaving the studio in 1947. Dalton's last project was The Goofy Gophers (1947), which was the first cartoon to feature those characters. He also did some uncredited animation in the Daffy Duck cartoon called Mexican Joyride (1947).

References

External links

1908 births
1974 deaths
American animated film directors
Warner Bros. Cartoons directors